Honeydew (formerly, Honey Dew) is an unincorporated community in Humboldt County, California. It has a general store, elementary school, post office, and a few houses nearby. Many of the locals live in the hills surrounding the Mattole valley, named after  the Mattole River which runs through the valley. The ZIP code is 95545 and the community is inside area code 707.

History
The first post office at Honeydew opened in 1926. Honeydew, Petrolia and Capetown were originally stagecoach and mail stops in the 1800s.

Transportation
The steepness and related geotechnical challenges of the coastal mountains made this stretch of coastline too costly for state highway or county road builders to establish routes through the area, leaving it the most undeveloped portion of the California coast. California State Route 1, which runs along the coast for most of the route's length, stops at Leggett and merges with U.S. Route 101, which runs several miles inland.

There are three roads leading to Honeydew: one comes from neighboring Southern Humboldt town of Garberville, which follows Wilder Ridge Road, another off U.S. Route 101 (State Highway) that runs through the Redwood forest, and another from Ferndale in the north. The Ferndale route, over what is locally known as "the Wildcat" (in reference to bobcats that reside in the area) offers scenic views of the Pacific Ocean and the neighboring town of Petrolia. All three routes traverse twisting mountain roads, which can be treacherous in bad weather, especially during coastal fog conditions. The valley itself is at a confluence of climates.

It is wise for travelers in the area to prepare for quickly changing weather in all seasons, as there is limited cell phone coverage, being primarily nearest the Honeydew General Store and the river valley flats nearby, should emergency help be required. Electricity and access to the area can be interrupted in inclement weather. People visiting the area are encouraged to check local road reports should conditions change. Fuel is generally – but not always – available at the General Store, and at Petrolia,  to the west.

Schools
There are three schools in the area: Honeydew Elementary School, Mattole Valley Triple Junction High School and Honeydew Charter School #159.

Culture 
Because of its isolated location, Honeydew retains a small town atmosphere. There are no motels in the town, but there are several campgrounds nearby. The local firefighters, Honeydew Volunteer Fire Company, organize the "Roll on the Mattole" every summer to raise operating funds for the fire company. The region has a long history of sheep and cattle ranching.

The Mattole Grange is the main gathering place for community events.

Climate
The Köppen Climate Classification subtype for this climate is "Csb". (Mediteranean Climate). Honeydew is one of the rainiest communities in California.

See also

References

External links 
 Honeydew Post Office (95545) location
 www.mattolehistory.org — Mattole Valley Historical Society

Unincorporated communities in Humboldt County, California
Unincorporated communities in California